Sigmoilina is a miliolid genus, referring to the foraminiferal order Miliolida, characterized by an assymmetricall biconvex test formed by strongly overlapping chambers, one-half coil in length, that form a sigmoid (S-shaped) curve in cross section. The strongly overlapping chambers obliterate earlier ones from view resulting in the compressed biloculine appearance, differing from the  squat, depressed biloculine form of Pyrgo and Biloculina.   The test, as for all Miliolida, is porcelaneous and imperphorate, the terminal aperture, with tooth, the only point of egress and ingress for the animal.

Sigmoilina is a protist, or proctoctist according to B.K. Sen Gupta, 1999, included in the miliolid family Hauerinidae (Loeblich & Tappan, 1988). It was previously assigned to the Miliolidae (Loeblich & Tappan, 1964) when foraminifera were regarded as comprising a suborder (Foraminiferida).

References
 Alfred R. Loeblich Jr and Helen Tappan, 1964. Sarcodina Chiefly "Thecamoebians" and Foraminiferida; Treatise on Invertebrate Paleontology, Part C Protista 2. Geological Society of America and University of Kansas Press. 
 Alfred R. Loeblich Jr and Helen Tappan, 1988. Forminiferal Genera and their Classification.
Barun K. Sen Gupta 1999. Modern Foraminifera. 
Sigmoilina in Fossilworks (Paleo db)

Tubothalamea
Foraminifera genera
Extant Miocene first appearances